Bompuka Island, also known as Poahat, is an island of India, in the Andaman and Nicobar Islands.

Geography
The Island is located 3.5 km east from Teressa.
The island has dense forest and some portions have grass. There is thick coconut palm growth on the shores around the island.
Abandoned Poahat Village lies on the W side of the island. The portion of sea between the Teressa and Bompuka islands provides a good shelter for ships.

Demographics 
The Island had 2 villages: Poahat at the north, and Yatkirana at the south. both abandoned. The former villagers still maintain Coconut, Tuber Crops as seasonal villagers from Teressa come to live on the island for a short period, carrying all requirements from Teressa Island. 
According to the 2011 census of India, Bompuka Island has 0 households. The Entire population of 21 people moved to Teressa following the tsunami, although they have attempted to restore habitation on the island, unsuccessfully.

Administration
The island belongs to the township of Nancowry of Teressa Taluk.

Image gallery

References 

Teressa Taluk
Islands of the Andaman and Nicobar Islands
Uninhabited islands of India
Nicobar district
Nicobar Islands
Islands of India
Islands of the Bay of Bengal